Tonje Frydenberg Daffinrud (born 19 September 1991) is a retired Norwegian professional golfer. She played on the Ladies European Tour between 2015 and 2021, and represented Norway at the 2020 Tokyo Olympics.

Amateur career
As a junior, Daffinrud represented Europe at the 2009 Junior Solheim Cup. She also represented the Norwegian National Team at the European Ladies' Team Championship and Espirito Santo Trophy. She played collegiate golf with the Denver Pioneers, like her compatriot Espen Kofstad, and graduated from the University of Denver in 2014 with a degree in International Business and Economics.

In 2016, she won the Norwegian National Golf Championship and was awarded the Kongepokal.

Professional career
Daffinrud joined the LET Access Series midway through the 2014 season and won two tournaments back-to-back in October, the Azores Ladies Open in Azores, Portugal and the Grecotel Amirandes Ladies Open in Crete, Greece. After three further top-five finishes, she finished fifth on the 2014 LETAS Order of Merit and earned LET membership for the 2015 Ladies European Tour.

Her rookie season on the LET in 2015 was affected by injury. She played in eight tournaments with a season best T13 at the Lalla Meryem Cup. In 2017, she earned her first top-10 finish with a T6 in the Oates Vic Open and in 2019 posted two top-10s, T10 in La Reserva de Sotogrande Invitational and her career best finish of T4 in the Ladies European Thailand Championship along with Marianne Skarpnord. She qualified for the 2017, 2019 and 2020 Women's British Open as one of the top 25 from the current LET Order of Merit, and was successful in the local qualifiers in 2018.

In 2019, she won the Swedish Golf Tour Order of Merit and finished a career-best 18th on the LET Order of Merit.

Plagued by injuries, Daffinrud announced her retirement from tour following the 2020 Tokyo Olympics, just days before her 30th birthday.

Professional wins (5)

LET Access Series wins (3)

1Co-sanctioned by the Swedish Golf Tour

Swedish Golf Tour (2)

1Co-sanctioned by the LET Access Series

Other wins
2016 Norwegian National Golf Championship

Results in LPGA majors
Results not in chronological order.

CUT = missed the half-way cut.
NT = no tournament

Team appearances
Amateur
European Ladies' Team Championship (representing Norway): 2007, 2010, 2011
Espirito Santo Trophy (representing Norway): 2008, 2010, 2012, 2014
Junior Solheim Cup: (representing Europe): 2009

References

External links
 
 
 
 
 

Norwegian female golfers
Ladies European Tour golfers
Olympic golfers of Norway
Golfers at the 2020 Summer Olympics
Denver Pioneers women's golfers
Sportspeople from Tønsberg
1991 births
Living people